Church Hill, also known as Timber Ridge Plantation, is a historic plantation house located near Lexington, Rockbridge County, Virginia. It was built circa 1848, and is a two-story, three bay, rectangular brick Greek Revival style dwelling.  It has a one-story, rear kitchen ell.  The house features stuccoed Doric order pilasters at the corners and midpoints of the long sides. Timber Ridge Plantation was the birthplace of Sam Houston (1793-1863). On the property is a non-contributing log building which tradition claims was constructed from logs salvaged from the Sam Houston birthplace cabin.  The cabin is believed to have been located at the site of the kitchen ell.

It was listed on the National Register of Historic Places in 1979.

See also
 John Houston (1690–1754), who established Timber Ridge Plantation

References

Plantation houses in Virginia
Houses on the National Register of Historic Places in Virginia
Greek Revival houses in Virginia
Houses completed in 1848
Houses in Rockbridge County, Virginia
National Register of Historic Places in Rockbridge County, Virginia